Conospermum stoechadis, commonly known as common smokebush, is a shrub endemic to Western Australia.

Description
It grows as an erect, multi-stemmed shrub, with a lignotuber, from 0.3 to two metres high. It has slender needle-like leaves from two to 17 centimetres long and 0.6 to 2.25 millimetres wide, and panicles of white or grey flowers.

Taxonomy
It was first published in 1838 by Stephan Endlicher, based on material collected  by Charles von Hügel from the vicinity of King George Sound. It has since had a fairly involved taxonomic history. In 1839, John Lindley published a purported new species, C. sclerophyllum, but this has since been demoted to a subspecies of C. stoechadis. In 1848, Carl Meissner published C. canaliculatum; this was demoted to a variety of C. stoechadis by George Bentham in 1870, but has since between restored to specific rank. In 1919, Michel Gandoger published two new species, C. elegantulum and C. proximum, but both of these have since been found to be synonymous with C. stoechadis. In each case, the current status was designated by Eleanor Bennett's 1995 treatment of Conospermum for the Flora of Australia series of monographs.

There are two subspecies: C. stoechadis subsp. sclerophyllum and the autonym C. stoechadis subsp. stoechadis.

Distribution and habitat
It occurs on sand and laterite, on sandplains throughout the Southwest Botanic Province, and also east as far as Southern Cross.

Ecology
It is not considered threatened.

References

External links

Eudicots of Western Australia
stoechadis